Fatma Hümeyra Akbay (born 15 October 1947) is a Turkish actress, singer, composer, and lyricist. In the 1970s she was a noted singer and actress. Her popularity with the new generation rose in the 2000s with the hit sitcom Avrupa Yakası, Yalan Dünya by Gülse Birsel. She played in popular youth series "Melekler Korusun" and "Şahsiyet" which won International Emmy Awards. She played in Çağan Irmak's many films like Babam ve Oğlum, Unutursam Fısılda.

Musical fame
In the 1970s, her songs "Kördüğüm", "Sessiz Gemi", "Otuz Beş Yaş" were very successful. Her later albums Tutkulardan İntihar, Beyhude were outside the mainstream. "Tutkulardan İntihar" was one of the first examples of Turkish rap songs.

Acting
She debuted in theater. Her debut acting in a feature film was Talihli Amele. In 1985, with Ferhan Şensoy's "Ortaoyuncular" troupe, she took part in the stage play İçinden Tramvay Geçen Şarkı. In 1986, she won the Golden Orange for Best Supporting Actress Award with her performance in Asiye Nasıl Kurtulur? at Antalya Film Festival. She was also awarded the honorary "Illuminating Apollo" award at the 10th İstanbul International Meeting of Cinema-History in 2007. She has married and divorced actor Fikret Hakan and later director Ömer Kavur.

Discography

Singles
 "Kördüğüm/Yol" (Yonca Plak, 1969)
 "Je Sais Que Tu Sais / Il Viendra Celui Que J'aime" (Philips, 1969)
 "Ölüm/Olmasa (Güzelliğin On Para Etmez)" (Melodi Plak, 1969)
 "Dilber/Perişan" (Yonca Plak, 1970)
 "Güzel Ne Güzel Olmuşsun/Bana Kara Diyen Dilber" (Yonca Plak, 1970)
 "Yalan Dünya/Ceylan" (Yonca Plak, 1971)
 "Adım Kadın/Ben Sana Mecburum" (Yonca Plak, 1972)
 "Yiğit/Yardan Haber Yok" (1 Numara, 1974)
 "Dönülmez Bir Yoldayım/Ey Sevgili Sevgilim" (EMI, 1975)
 "Otuz Beş Yaş/Susun Ağlayacağım" (EMI, 1975)
 "Sessiz Gemi/Şükür Verdiklerine" (EMI, 1975)
 "Onu Bana Sakla/Sus, Duymasın" (EMI, 1976)
 "Benim Derdim Seninle/Bundan İyisi Can Sağlığı" (EMI, 1977)
 "Seni Bırakamam/Yüzün Yağmurda" (EMI, 1978)
 "Do Do Do Do Si Re Re/Sevdim Seni Bir Kere" (EMI, 1980)
 "Aşk Kapıyı Çalınca/Bir Damla Yaş" (Balet, 1981)

Albums (LP/MC/CD)
 Anlatamıyorum, (EMI, LP, 1977)
 Benim Şarkılarım (Balet, LP, 1984; Ossi Müzik, CD, 13 August 2010)
 Yıllar Sonra (Sarp Plak, MC, 1988)
 Tutkulardan İntihar (Sarp Plak, MC, June 1990)
 Beyhude (Ada Müzik, CD-MC, 26 March 1997)
 Eski 45'likler (Ada Müzik, CD, 1998)

Filmography

Feature films

TV series
Melekler Korusun
Kelebek Çıkmazı
Avrupa Yakası
Sıla
Estağfurullah Yokuşu
Üzgünüm Leyla
Hayalimde Hep Sensin
Paramparça
Şahsiyet
Kadın
Yalan Dünya
Yüz Yıllık Mucize

References

External links

 
 Official website

1947 births
Turkish film actresses
Best Supporting Actress Golden Orange Award winners
Living people
20th-century Turkish actresses
20th-century Turkish women singers
21st-century Turkish actresses
21st-century Turkish women singers
Turkish stage actresses
Turkish television actresses
Actresses from Istanbul
Singers from Istanbul